RNLB Lester (ON 1287) is the ALB lifeboat stationed at Cromer in the English county of Norfolk. Cromer is the first lifeboat station on the east of England coast to receive the latest Tamar-class all-weather lifeboat. The lifeboat became officially operational at 3:55 pm on 6 January 2008. The lifeboat was officially christened Lester on Monday 8 September by  the Duke of Kent. The lifeboats name Lester has been created by using parts of the surnames of Derek Clifton Lethern and William Foster, both of whom have been long-term supporters and members of the RNLI. Mr Lethern left £1.23m to the RNLI when he died in 1992 and asked for a new lifeboat to be bought in memory of him and his friend Mr Foster.

Design and construction
Lester ON 1287 is a Tamar class slipway launched lifeboat, designed to replace the Tyne-class lifeboat. The Tamar class lifeboat  is the most advanced vessel in the RNLI fleet. The  Lester ON 1287  is loaded with new technology, including fly-by-wire joystick steering, suspension seats to protect crew in severe weather, and an onboard computer system called Systems and Information Management System or SIMS. SIMS allows complex tasks such as engine and navigation management to be displayed on a single flat LCD screen, six of which are positioned around the vessel, to allow crew to operate all the systems without moving from their seats. In the stern section of Lester ON 1287 there is a built in recessed chamber which house a small inflatable daughter boat. Access to the inflatable daughter boat is by means of lowering the transom, and lifting a section of deck. This allows the tender to be launched and recovered on to a ramp provided by the lowered transom section. On the Lester ON 1287 the Y class boat has the official number Y-207. The lifeboat's hull was manufactured at Green Marine in Lymington, Hampshire, and is constructed from Fibre reinforced plastic (FRP). The fitting out was completed at the yards of DML in Devonport, Plymouth, Devon. The lengthy process of fitting out involves all the main components being fitted into the vessel and secured to their mounting points. Once this has been done the component units are removed from the hull leaving the mounts in place and the interior is then painted.  The lifeboat was built at a cost  of £2.5 million and was launched on 26 April 2007.

Lifeboat house modifications
Extensive work had to be carried out at the lifeboat station to upgrade the 38 metre pier end slipway to take the new- shaped vessel as well as alterations being carried out to the boathouse. The work on the station was carried out by the platform rig Haven Seaway between August and October 2007.

Career
After her launch the Lester ON 1287 underwent a long period of sea trials. Around 30  Cromer crewmen took part in these trials to familiarise themselves with their new lifeboat. On 8 October 2007 the lifeboat crew took part in a week of training aboard the new lifeboat at the RNLI Lifeboat college in Poole, Dorset. The lifeboat finally arrived at Cromer on 9 December 2007 and was recovered, for the first time, up her new slipway in to the boathouse. and the vessel was officially operational from 6 January 2008.

First service
Lester ON 1287  was launched on her first service on 14 January 2008. She attended the car carrier MF The City of Sunderland which had gone aground in the early hours of the morning on the southern edge of Happisburgh Sands. The car carrier had been on passage from Zeebrugge to Tees Port near Middlesbrough. When the Lester arrived at the scene, two tugs from Felixstowe were attempting to tow the vessel off the sands. Assisting with the operation the crew of the lifeboat kept a watchful eye on the situation and stood by while the vessel carried out essential checks to her steering and propulsion systems once she was re-floated. The Lifeboat finally left the scene at 23:50 and made her way back to the pier boathouse for recovery.

Service and rescues

Gallery

References

 

Cromer lifeboats
Tamar-class lifeboats
2007 ships